Geelen is a surname most common in Belgian and Dutch Limburg. In most instances it has a patronymic origin, where Geel was a variant of Giel, itself a short form of either Aegidius, Gilbert or Michiel.   Notable people with this name include:

 Guido Geelen (born 1961), Dutch sculptor, furniture designer and ceramist
 Harrie Geelen (born 1939) Dutch illustrator, film director, animator, translator, writer and poet.
 Jim Geelen (born c.1971), Canadian mathematician and combinatorialist
 Pie Geelen (born 1972), Dutch freestyle swimmer
 Pieter Geelen (born 1964), Dutch inventor and entrepreneur, founder of TomTom

See also
Gielen, surname of the same origin

References

Dutch-language surnames
Patronymic surnames